Theodoros "Thodoris" Chatzitheodorou (born 1 October 1976) is a retired Greek water polo player and current coach.

Chatzitheodorou started his career at Ilisiakos and then moved to Olympiacos where he played for fifteen consecutive seasons (1995–2010), winning 27 major titles (1 LEN Euroleague, 1 LEN Supercup, 12 Greek Championships, 11 Greek Cups and 2 Greek Supercups) and being voted Best European Player of the Year in 2001. He captained Olympiacos for several years and was a key player in Olympiacos' 2002 Quardruple (LEN Champions League, LEN Super Cup, Greek Championship, Greek Cup all in 2002).

In 2010–2011 season he played for VK Partizan, where he won the LEN Euroleague, the Serbian Championship, the Serbian Cup and the Eurointer Cup.

He has 156 appearances with Greece national water polo team, with whom he won the Bronze Medal in the 2005 World Championship in Montreal and the Bronze Medal in the 2004 World League in Long Beach. A four-time Olympian, Chatzitheodorou competed in the 1996 Summer Olympics (6th place), the 2000 Summer Olympics (10th place), the 2004 Summer Olympics (4th place) and the 2012 Summer Olympics (9th place) with the Greece men's national water polo team.

He is currently the record holder of titles (31) in the history of Greek team sports.

Club career
 1993–1995  Ilisiakos
 1995–2010  Olympiacos
 2010–2011  Partizan
 2011–2012  Chios
 2012–2013  Nireas Lamias

Honours

Club
Olympiacos
 LEN Euroleague (1): 2001–02
 LEN Super Cup (1): 2002
 Greek Championship (12): 1996, 1999, 2000, 2001, 2002, 2003, 2004, 2005, 2007, 2008, 2009, 2010
 Greek Cup (11): 1997, 1998, 2001, 2002, 2003, 2004, 2006, 2007, 2008, 2009, 2010
 Greek Super Cup (2): 1997, 1998

Partizan
 LEN Euroleague (1) : 2010–11
 Serbian Championship (1): 2010–11
 Serbian Cup (1): 2010–11
 Eurointer League (1): 2010–11

National team
  Bronze Medal in 2005 World Championship, Montreal
  Bronze Medal in 2004 World League, Long Beach
 4th place in 2004 Olympic Games, Athens
 6th place in 1996 Olympic Games, Atlanta
 4th place in 2003 World Championship, Barcelona

Individual
 Best European Player in 2001

See also
 Greece men's Olympic water polo team records and statistics
 List of players who have appeared in multiple men's Olympic water polo tournaments
 List of World Aquatics Championships medalists in water polo

References

External links
 
 Theodoros Chatzitheodorou career highlights Nautical Club of Chios website 

1976 births
Living people
Greek male water polo players
Greek water polo coaches
Olympic water polo players of Greece
Olympiacos Water Polo Club players
Water polo players at the 1996 Summer Olympics
Water polo players at the 2000 Summer Olympics
Water polo players at the 2004 Summer Olympics
Water polo players at the 2012 Summer Olympics
World Aquatics Championships medalists in water polo
Water polo players from Athens